Mizue (written: 瑞枝 or みづえ in hiragana) is a feminine Japanese given name. Notable people with the name include:

, Japanese alpine skier
Mizue Sawano (born 1941), Japanese artist
, Japanese singer and idol

Fictional characters
, a character in the video game series La Corda d'Oro
, a character in the anime series Psycho-Pass

See also
Mizue Station, a railway station in Edogawa, Tokyo, Japan

Japanese feminine given names